The Hancock Ministry was the combined Cabinet (called Executive Council of Alberta), chaired by 15th Premier of Alberta Dave Hancock, that governed Alberta from March 23, 2014 to September 15, 2014. It was made up of members of the Progressive Conservative Party (PC).

Hancock, previously deputy premier in the Redford Ministry, was sworn into office following Alison Redford's resignation. He inherited Redford's cabinet and, as he was only serving as premier until the party could elect a permanent leader, said he was "not planning to make any real changes in cabinet." However, he also said that any cabinet minister who decides to runs for the leadership must resign, in order to prevent an unfair advantage. On May 7, Ric McIver resigned in order to contest the leadership; he was replaced as infrastructure minister by Wayne Drysdale.

List of ministers

See also 
 Executive Council of Alberta
 List of Alberta provincial ministers

References

Citations

Sources

Politics of Alberta
Executive Council of Alberta
2014 establishments in Alberta
Cabinets established in 2014
2014 disestablishments in Alberta
Cabinets disestablished in 2014